Al-Masafi Stadium is a multi-use stadium in Baghdad, Iraq. It is currently used mostly for football matches and serves as the home stadium of Al-Masafi.  The stadium holds 5,000 people.

See also 
List of football stadiums in Iraq

References

Football venues in Iraq
Buildings and structures in Baghdad
Sport in Baghdad